Castle Saunderson is a castle near Belturbet in County Cavan, Ireland. It was the former family seat of the Saunderson family, and is now in ruins. The Finn River flows along the north-eastern edge of the Castle Saunderson Demesne, where the river enters a narrow channel of Upper Lough Erne. The castle is about a half a mile west from Wattlebridge, a small hamlet in the south-south-east of County Fermanagh.

The Castle Saunderson International Scouting Centre is a Scouting Ireland facility, opened in 2012 within the grounds of the castle. The centre provides indoor accommodation and campsites covering . It is open to Scouts year round, as well as to non-Scouts for most of the year. It currently acts as a World Scouting Centre for the Scouts, alongside Cairo International Scout Centre in Egypt and others.

History

Family home
The Saunderson family acquired the original castle during the Plantation of Ulster. The original castle was inhabited by the O'Reillys of Breffni and was formerly known as Breffni Castle from the 14th century. Robert Sanderson, who fought on the side of William of Orange, inherited the castle from his father in 1676. James II's troops burned the castle in 1689. Months later, 400 of King James's soldiers were ambushed here while on retreat from the battle at Newtownbutler. They were driven toward the Finn River and many drowned.

The present castle dates to 1840 and was destroyed by fire in 1990. A notable member of the family born there was Colonel Edward James Saunderson, a founder of the Ulster Unionist Party, and the castle hosted Orange Order events celebrating The Twelfth. Major Frederick John Sandys Lindesay of Loughry and Tullyhogue died there while a guest in 1877. The Hon. Barry Maxwell, eldest son and heir apparent of The 10th Baron Farnham, died in a cycling accident on the estate in 1879.

The last Saunderson who owned the castle was Edward's grandson, Captain Alexander "Sandy" Saunderson. He was a prisoner of war during the Second World War and was later present at the War Tribunal at Nuremberg as the legal advisor to Lord Justice Lawrence. He sold the property to a businessman in 1977. He had planned to use it as a residence, but this never transpired. It later served as a hotel, but was damaged by fire, the third fire to occur at the castle.

The Castle Saunderson Demesne, currently only , has entrances in County Fermanagh in Northern Ireland and County Cavan in the Republic of Ireland. The demesne includes a church with crypt and family graveyard.

International Scout Centre
In 1997 the castle and its grounds were acquired by Scouting Ireland (CSI). The subsequent formation of Scouting Ireland, and financial difficulties, delayed its development, and put the campsite project in doubt. With support from the American Ireland Fund and Cavan County Council, substantial progress occurred, with the announcement in November 2008 of EU funding for the project, amounting to over €3 million.

His Excellency Michael D. Higgins, President of Ireland, opened the €3.7 million European-funded Castle Saunderson International Scouting Centre in County Cavan on 18 August 2012. The President was joined by dignitaries from both sides of the Border, including Northern Ireland Executive Ministers Jonathan Bell, Nelson McCausland and Jennifer McCann, and Minister of State in the Republic, Fergus O’Dowd.

In February 2015, Minister Heather Humphreys announced the approval of the restoration by Waterways Ireland of a canal, part of the Ulster Canal, connecting the site to the Erne basin.

The site delivers programmes which complement the Messenger of Peace Award.

The centre has been used by the Health Service Executive as a mass testing centre during the COVID-19 outbreak in Ireland.

References

External links 
 Castle Saunderson International Scout Centre official website

Saunderson
Houses in the Republic of Ireland
Buildings and structures in County Cavan
Country houses in Ireland
Campsites of Scouting Ireland
Scout Activity Centres in Ireland